The Harvard Subdivision is a  railway line which runs from Chicago, Illinois to Evansville, Wisconsin. It is owned by the Union Pacific Railroad. It hosts both freight traffic and Metra's Union Pacific / Northwest Line commuter rail service. The line previously belonged to the Chicago and North Western Railway.

Route 
The subdivision originates at Ogilvie Transportation Center and is quad-tracked from there to CY Tower, just south of Clybourn station, where it meets the Kenosha Subdivision. It is triple-tracked from CY Tower to Barrington station, and then double-tracked through Harvard, the furthest extent of commuter service. At Crystal Lake Junction, just south of Crystal Lake station, the Harvard Subdivision meets the McHenry Subdivision, which also carries commuter rail traffic. Northwest of Harvard the subdivision is single-tracked.

Notes

References 
 

Union Pacific Railroad lines
Rail infrastructure in Illinois
Rail infrastructure in Wisconsin